Hibernians Football Club is a Maltese professional football club based in the town of Paola.

History
The club played one season in 1922 as Constitutionals FC, representing the pro-British Constitutional Party. They started up again in the 1927–28 season and became a top amateur side, winning the Amateur League in 1930–31.

Meanwhile, the Constitutional Party had upset the Catholic Church so much that, in May 1930, Catholics were told not to vote for the party. The football club changed its name a year later to Hibernians Football Club as a nod to Hibernian, the club founded by Irish Catholics in Edinburgh. They won their first match as Hibernians 2–1, against  in October 1931. They had to wait for a place to become available in the professional league, but in January 1933 they joined the league with a 3–1 victory over Sliema Rangers. They have stayed in the top division ever since.

Hibernians faced a long period of decline followed the success of the 1980s to the end of the decade. Hibernians have a futsal team, which plays in Malta's top futsal league, the Premier Futsal League.

Stadium

The club's home ground is Hibernians Stadium, a multi-use stadium in Paola, which has a capacity of about 3,000.

Honours

Maltese Premier League 
 Winners (13): 1960–61, 1966–67, 1968–69, 1978–79, 1980–81, 1981–82, 1993–94, 1994–95, 2001–02, 2008–09, 2014–15, 2016–17, 2021–22

Maltese FA Trophy
 Winners (10): 1961–62, 1969–70, 1970–71, 1979–80, 1981–82, 1997–98, 2005–06, 2006–07, 2011–12, 2012–13

Maltese Super Cup
 Winners (4): 1994, 2007, 2015, 2022

Cassar Cup: (2)
1961–1962, 1962–1963

Testaferrata Cup: (3)
1977–1978, 1978–1979, 1980–1981

Independence Cup: (3)
1967–1968, 1968–1969, 1970–1971

Sons of Malta Cup: (3)
1969–1970, 1970–1971, 1971–1972

Olympic Cup: (1)
1962–1963

Schembri Shield: (1)
1961–1962

European Record
Accurate as of 11 August 2022

Legend: GF = Goals For. GA = Goals Against. GD = Goal Difference.

Players

Maltese teams are limited to eight players without Maltese citizenship. The squad list includes only the principal nationality of each player; several non-European players on the squad have dual citizenship with an EU country.

Current squad

Out on loan

Managers
 Robert Gatt (30 June 1998 – 8 July 2007)
 Edmond Lufi (2007 – 8 September 2008)
 Mark Miller (1 July 2008 – 2012)
 Michael Woods (13 June 2012 – 2013)
 Branko Nišević (30 May 2013 – 2016)
 Mark Miller (2016 – 5 March 2018)
 Mario Muscat (5 March 2018 – 4 July 2018)
 Stefano Sanderra (4 July 2018 –30 June 2022)
 Andrea Pisanu  (8 July 2022- )

Women's team
A women's team plays in the Women's Maltese First Division. The team is the national record champion with twelve titles, the most recent being won in 2016.

See also
 Hibernians Basketball Club

References

External links

 
Football clubs in Malta
Association football clubs established in 1922
1922 establishments in Malta